was a former justice minister of Japan and Professor Emeritus at Tokyo University. He was a leading figure in civil procedure scholarship.

Career
Mikazuki was an attorney and law professor. He was a member of the Arbitration Law Study Group who drafted the arbitration law in 1989.

He was appointed justice minister under the non-Liberal Democratic Party Hosokawa Morihiro cabinet, although he was not a politician. He replaced Masaharu Gotoda as justice minister. He was in office from 9 August 1993 to 28 April 1994. His successor was Shigeto Nagano.

Mikazuki reported that anyone who had plans to abolish capital punishment could not accept an appointment as justice minister. He approved executions for four death row inmates and believed in the deterrent effect of capital punishment. Four executions were carried out during his term in Autumn 1993.

Awards
Mikazuki received the Order of Culture award in Tokyo on 7 November 2007.

Death
Mikazuki died on 14 November 2010.

References

External links

20th-century Japanese politicians
20th-century scholars
1921 births
2010 deaths
Independent politicians
Ministers of Justice of Japan
Recipients of the Order of Culture
Academic staff of the University of Tokyo